Ingrid Suzanne Johnsrude is a Canadian neuroscientist, a professor of psychology at University of Western Ontario, and was the holder of the Canada Research Chair in Cognitive Neuroscience. Her research involves brain imaging, the connections between brain structure and language ability, and the diagnosis of degenerative brain diseases in the elderly.

Johnsrude did her undergraduate studies in psychology at Queens University, graduating in 1989, and went on for graduate studies to McGill University, where she received her Ph.D. in 1997 under the supervision of Brenda Milner. After postdoctoral studies at University College London, she became a scientist at the Cognition and Brain Sciences Unit in Cambridge, England, where she studied the relationship between neuroanatomy and the ability to be affected by operant conditioning as well as the brain structures active during speech recognition. She returned to Queens University as a faculty member in 2004.

Johnsrude's 2001 work on voxel-based morphometry in the journal NeuroImage is one of the most heavily cited papers in that journal. In 2003, Johnsrude and her co-authors received an Ig Nobel Prize in Medicine for their work showing that London taxi drivers had more highly developed hippocampi than those in other professions.
In 2004, while still an assistant professor, Johnsrude was awarded her Canada Research Chair; it was renewed in 2009. In 2009, Canadian prime minister Stephen Harper presented Johnsrude with the NSERC E.W.R. Steacie Fellowship, an award given annually to a small number of younger Canadian researchers with an international reputation for excellent research. In 2010, Johnsrude was elected to the Global Young Academy.

References

External links
Faculty web page at Queen's University.

Year of birth missing (living people)
Living people
Canadian neuroscientists
Canadian women neuroscientists
Queen's University at Kingston alumni
McGill University alumni
Alumni of University College London
Canada Research Chairs
Academic staff of the University of Western Ontario